Oatmeal Crisp is a breakfast cereal from General Mills. It consists of flattened oatmeal flakes glazed with a sugary coating. Discontinued, limited edition or limited market varieties of the original have included Oatmeal Crisp Almond, Oatmeal Crisp Apple Crisp, Oatmeal Crisp Crunchy Almond, Oatmeal Crisp with Hearty Raisins, Oatmeal Crisp Raisin, Oatmeal Raisin Crisp, Oatmeal Crisp Maple Brown Sugar, Oatmeal Crisp Maple Nut Flavour, Oatmeal Crisp Vanilla, Oatmeal Crisp Vanilla Yogurt.

References

General Mills cereals